Brookshire Brothers, is an employee-owned American supermarket chain headquartered in Lufkin, Texas, founded in 1921 by brothers Austin and Tom Brookshire. Brookshire Brothers is a private corporation that is wholly owned by employees. Brookshire Brothers operates stores in two Southern United States; Texas and Louisiana.
The companies assets today include a family of more than 110 retail outlets incorporating grocery stores and convenience stores, as well as free-standing pharmacy, tobacco, and gasoline locations.

History
As the business grew and more stores opened, Wood T. Brookshire and cousin W.A. Brookshire withdrew from the company and started Brookshire's, which now operates independently in Tyler, Texas.

The following growth through the 1950s and 60s, Austin Brookshire's three sons, Oscar, Eugene, and R.A., assumed leadership and grew the company to more than 70 stores. In 1999, as the surviving brothers neared retirement, the company embarked on an employee-owner stock buy out. By 2006, Brookshire Brothers achieved 100% employee-ownership. 

Brookshire Brothers continue to expand its footprint. It acquired the assets of David's Supermarkets out of Grandview, Texas in 2014 and built additional stores in Zavalla, Apple Springs, Pilot Point (at the location of a closed ALCO when that firm went out of business), Hamilton, and Canyon Lake, Texas.

In 2018, Brookshire Brothers announced they would provide delivery and curbside pickup from select locations. The services are offered through Rosie, which is a grocery delivery and pickup provider. The service was initially offered at 2 locations in Lufkin, Texas.

Brookshire Brothers Company is now owned entirely by its 7,000 employees; Brookshire's Food and Pharmacy has stayed in the family but is a separate chain.

Brands
Fresh Harvest
Food Club
Crav'n Flavor
Simply Done
Paws
TopCare
Cape Covelle Seafood
CharKing
WideAwake Coffee Co.
Tippy Toes
That's Smart

References

External links
Brookshire Brothers

Companies based in Texas
Angelina County, Texas
Employee-owned companies of the United States
Supermarkets of the United States
Lufkin, Texas